Russograptis is a genus of moths belonging to the family Tortricidae.

Species
Russograptis albulata Razowski & Trematerra, 2010
Russograptis callopista (Durrant, 1913)
Russograptis medleri Razowski, 1981
Russograptis solaris Razowski, 1981

Former species
Russograptis canthararcha (Meyrick, 1937)

See also
List of Tortricidae genera

References

  2005: World Catalogue of Insects vol. 5 Tortricidae.
  1981: Acta zool. cracov. 25: 322.
 , 2010: Tortricidae (Lepidoptera) from Ethiopia Journal of Entomological and Acarological Research Serie II, 42 (2): 47–79. Abstract: .

External links
Tortricid.net

Tortricini
Tortricidae genera
Taxa named by Józef Razowski